Madh may refer to:
 Madh (alcohol),
 Madh Island, fishing villages and farmlands in northern Mumbai
 Madh (singer) (born 1993), Italian singer
 ACP-SH:acetate ligase, MadH, an enzyme
 Madh,, an abode or fortress